Bach Media is an audiovisual production company founded by the Cuban filmmaker Jesús Hernández Bach in April, 2014. Based in New York City, Bach Media specializes in the production, screening and distribution of Cuban films both in Cuba and in the United States. Bach Media also collaborates with producers from other countries who are interested in doing on-location filming in Cuba.

History 

While Bach Media has been in operation as a producer of Cuban audiovisual projects since April, 2014, the official start of its headquarters in New York City was April 2016. Under the direction of filmmaker Jesús Hernández Bach, Bach Media has offered support to producers from various countries with interest in filming in Cuba via its consultancy that offers them invaluable insights for filming on the island. Jesús Hernández Bach collaborated in Cuba with the Irish film director Paddy Breathnach during the preparation for his film Viva (2015), as well as with the German director Fatih Akin for his feature film El Padre (The Cut, 2014). Recently, Bach Media has provided support services to VICE productions in Cuba and has also collaborated with Condé Nast. Bach Media founder Jesús Hernández Bach says, "We look for interesting projects. The human aspects behind each one of these (projects) is of utmost importance, so that ultimately the Cuba that is shown to the world isn't the stereotypical view."

One of the fundamental objectives of Bach Media is to make the island's audiovisual output visible in the United States by means of festivals and screenings. In May, 2016, Bach Media presented the film Ella trabaja (She Works, Jesús Miguel Hernández, 2007) in the graduate Center of the City University of New York. In 2014, he organized the presentation of the short films Afuera (Outside, Vanessa Portieles and Yanelvis González, 2012) and Una noche (One Night, Lucy Mulloy, 2012)  at the Miami-based CCEMiami. In 2016, Bach Media co-sponsored the prestigious Havana Film Festival New York.

Bach Media supports works created in Cuba or by Cubans with marketing campaigns, outreach and public relations services. It was responsible for the marketing campaign for the film Tocando la luz (Touching the Light, 2015), by Oscar-nominated documentary filmmaker Jennifer Redfearn at the Miami Film Festival (MIFF, 2016) and DOCNY 2015, one of the "five most captivating documentary film festivals in the world."

Future plans 

Jesús Hernández Bach has declared that he intends to turn Bach Media into an audiovisual multiplatform that connects Cuba with countries outside of the island, especially the United States. In this way, it is an organization that contributes to the normalization of relations between the two nations in a positive context.

References

External links 

 Oficial Page

2014 establishments in New York City
American companies established in 2014
Audiovisual art
Companies based in New York City
Entertainment companies established in 2014